Allama Syed Shamsul Haq Afghani (born; 8 January 1901 – 16 August 1983) (Urdu: علامہ سیّد شمس الحق افغانی;(SI)) was an afghani Islamic scholar and former President of Wifaq ul Madaris Al-Arabia, Pakistan from 19 October 1959 – 12 January 1963.

Education 
He received his early education from his father, then entered a primary school in 1909. Then got further education from different scholars of Khyber Pakhtunkhwa and Afghanistan. He got his higher education from Darul Uloom Deoband in 1920 and completed his "Dora-e-Hadith" in 1921. His teachers include famous religious scholars like, Anwar Shah Kashmiri Mian Asghar Hussain Deobandi Muhammad Rasul Khan Hazarvi Ashraf Ali Thanwi and Shabbir Ahmad Usmani.

Career 
In 1923, he was appointed as the President of Madrasa Mazharul Uloom Karachi. In 1924 he became the president of Madrasa Irshad Uloom Latakana, Sindh. In 1932 he was appointed as the President of Madras Darul Fuyuz Sindh. From 1932 to 1939, he was a high-ranking teacher and Shaykh-ul-Tafsir at Darul Uloom Deoband. In 1944 served as a teacher of Jamiah Islamiah Talimuddin Dabhel. In 1948 he served as the President of Madrasa Qasim-ul-Uloom, Lahore. In 1963 he became the Shaykh-ul-Tafsir of the Islamia University of Bahawalpur and taught for about 12 years. He also served as a member of the Council of Islamic Ideology.

Literary works 
Afghani has authored many books, including:
 Uloom ul Quran
 Science Aur Islam 
 Ahkam ul Quran
 Mufradat ul Quran
 Mushkilat ul Quran
 Tasuwaf Aur Tameer e Kirdar
 Socialism Aur Islam
 communism Aur Islam
 Moin Al-Qada Wal Muftiyeen (Arabic)
 Ihtisab Qadianiat Volume 13 
 Islami Jihad
 Science Aur Islam
 Sharh Zabita-e-Deewani
Allami Mushkilat aur unka Qurani hal
 Sarmaya Darana Ishteraki Nizam Ka Islami Muashi Nizam Say Mawaznah

References

1901 births
1983 deaths
People from Charsadda District, Pakistan
Recipients of Sitara-i-Imtiaz
Pakistani Islamic religious leaders
Pakistani Sunni Muslim scholars of Islam
Muslim missionaries
Darul Uloom Deoband alumni
Presidents of Wifaq ul Madaris Al-Arabia
Deobandis
Wifaq ul Madaris Al-Arabia people